Mormond Hill (Scottish Gaelic A' Mhormhonadh, meaning the great hill or moor; known as Mormounth in Old Scots) is a large hill in Aberdeenshire, Scotland, not far from Fraserburgh. The villages of Strichen and New Leeds can be found at its southern foothills.

It also has a smattering of disused satellite dishes and masts on top, remnants from Cold War U.S. armed forces communications and British Telecom having a presence on the site.

The hill is mentioned in the traditional Scottish ballad known as Mormond Braes.
The word 'Brae' comes from bràigh ("top") in Scottish Gaelic, while the rest of the ballad is a mix of English and Scots, with references to 'Strichen toon'.  The ballad is about a girl who's lost her lover and is preparing herself to face the world and get another.
 
The hill is also referenced in the poem Farewell to Tarwathie by George Scroggie of Strichen, published in 1857, and now better known as the song published in Volume 1 of the Greig–Duncan collection (c. 1909).

As of 1990, there were the ruins of a hunting lodge, built in 1779.

The White Horse and the White Stag 

A white horse is depicted on the side of the hill made from white quartz that has been placed into position to make the shape; its location is some 1500 m NE of Strichen. It is believed to have been carved into the hillside in 1773, possibly to record the visit of Dr Johnson and James Boswell that year.

Tree growth below the figure is increasingly blocking the view. The stag was made by the tenants of the Laird to commemorate his wedding. There is some disagreement as to whether its original form was an outline figure or solid figure. At some stage it has been in outline only, but is now solid. The stag was cleaned in 1939, 1946, 1955, 1984 and in 1994/95.

Unusually, these are the only two hill figures located in Scotland. There are three more in Wales and roughly 50 more in England. The White Horse is one of sixteen horses in the United Kingdom. The stag is one of two stags in the United Kingdom, although the other, in the Rheidol Valley, near Aberystwyth, is a mining feature which merely resembles a stag and not a true hill figure.

References

Bibliography

External links

Satellite Dish Information-
NATO and Telecommunications Details
'Ban The Bomb' Information on old US-UK military communications

Hill figures in Scotland
History of Aberdeenshire
History of telecommunications in the United Kingdom
Military communications of the United Kingdom
Military history of Scotland
Military installations in Scotland
Mountains and hills of Aberdeenshire
North Sea energy
Telecommunications in Scotland
Transmitter sites in Scotland